Arsénio Martins Lafuente Nunes (born 30 August 1989), known simply as Arsénio, is a Portuguese professional footballer who plays for F.C. Arouca as a winger.

Club career
Born in Esposende, Braga District, Arsénio began playing football with local A.D. Esposende, signing with FC Porto at the age of 12 and completing his development with Leixões SC. He spent his first four years as a senior in the lower leagues, with Padroense FC, C.S. Marítimo B and G.D. Ribeirão.

Arsénio signed with C.F. Os Belenenses in summer 2012, playing his first match as a professional on 11 August and scoring once in a 3–1 home win against C.D. Feirense in the Segunda Liga. He contributed 42 games and five goals during the season, helping the Lisbon club to return to the Primeira Liga after three years.

Arsénio made his debut in the top tier on 18 August 2013, coming on as a 46th-minute substitute in a 0–3 home loss to Rio Ave FC. In the following transfer window, he was loaned to Moreirense F.C. of division two, scoring three times to help his team achieve promotion as champions. Subsequently, the move was made permanent for two years.

On 18 June 2015, Arsénio joined Bulgarian side PFC Litex Lovech. His first competitive appearance took place on 2 July, as he featured 77 minutes in a 1–1 draw at FK Jelgava in the first qualifying round of the UEFA Europa League. He scored his first goal in the league late in that month, helping his team to a 2–2 away draw against PFC Levski Sofia.

On 1 July 2017, Arsénio returned to Portugal, its top division and Moreirense by signing a two-year contract.

Honours
Belenenses
Segunda Liga: 2012–13

Moreirense
Segunda Liga: 2013–14

References

External links

1989 births
Living people
People from Esposende
Sportspeople from Braga District
Portuguese footballers
Association football wingers
Primeira Liga players
Liga Portugal 2 players
Segunda Divisão players
Padroense F.C. players
C.S. Marítimo players
G.D. Ribeirão players
C.F. Os Belenenses players
Moreirense F.C. players
F.C. Arouca players
First Professional Football League (Bulgaria) players
Second Professional Football League (Bulgaria) players
PFC Litex Lovech players
PFC CSKA Sofia players
Saudi Professional League players
Al-Fayha FC players
Portugal youth international footballers
Portuguese expatriate footballers
Expatriate footballers in Bulgaria
Expatriate footballers in Saudi Arabia
Portuguese expatriate sportspeople in Bulgaria
Portuguese expatriate sportspeople in Saudi Arabia